Abuela or Abuelas may refer to:
Spanish for grandmother
Albillo or abuela, a white Spanish wine grape variety
Cristina Calderón or "Abuela" (1928–2022), last native speaker of the Yaghan language
Las abuelas, a 1965 Mexican telenovela
The Grandmother (1981 film), a Colombian drama film
The Grandmother (2021 film), a Spanish-French horror film
"La abuela", a 1945 article by Teodoro Núñez Ureta for which he won the National Journalism Award of Peru 
Abuela, a 1991 book by Arthur Dorros
La abuela, a 2006 book by Ariel Magnus